Bucculatrix loxoptila is a moth in the  family Bucculatricidae. It was described by Edward Meyrick in 1914. It is found in Tanzania.

The larvae feed on Gossypium species.

References

External links
Natural History Museum Lepidoptera generic names catalog

Bucculatricidae
Moths described in 1914
Taxa named by Edward Meyrick
Moths of Africa